RCJ is a common abbreviation for 

 RCJ (radio station), a Jewish radio station in Paris
 Royal Courts of Justice in the Strand in London, England
 Royal Courts of Justice, Belfast in Chichester Street in Belfast, Northern Ireland
 Rogationists of the Heart of Jesus, a Catholic religious order